The Open Court Publishing Company is a publisher with offices in Chicago and LaSalle, Illinois. It is part of the Carus Publishing Company of Peru, Illinois.

History
Open Court was founded in 1887 by Edward C. Hegeler of the Matthiessen-Hegeler Zinc Company, at one time the largest producer of zinc in the United States. Hegeler intended for the firm to serve the purpose of discussing religious and psychological problems on the principle that the scientific world-conception should be applied to religion. Its first managing editor was Paul Carus, Hegeler's son-in-law through his marriage to engineer Mary Hegeler Carus. For the first 80 years of its existence, the company had its offices in the Hegeler Carus Mansion.

Open Court specializes in philosophy, science, and religion. It was one of the first academic presses in the country, as well as one of the first publishers of inexpensive editions of the classics. It also published the journals Open Court and The Monist— the latter is still being published. The Open Court Monthly Magazine's motto was "Devoted to the Science of Religion, the Religion of Science, and the Extension of the Religious Parliament Idea."

Open Court Journal (1887-1936)
The Open Court journal was founded in February 1887 as the official publication of the Free Religious Association. By the end of 1887, its editor Benjamin F. Underwood resigned and Paul Carus became editor. The Open Court Publishing Company published The Open Court journal until 1936. Carus edited the journal for 32 years, until his death.

Popular Culture & Philosophy series

One of Open Court Publishing's best-selling series is its semi-annual Popular Culture & Philosophy series, under the editorship of George Reisch. Volumes on the philosophy underpinning such television shows as Star Trek, Seinfeld, The Simpsons, and Buffy the Vampire Slayer propelled the series into the limelight.

See also
 Open Court Reading

Notes

References
Fields, Rick. How the Swans Came to the Lake: A Narrative History of Buddhism in America (1992) Shambhala Publications.

External links
Official Open Court store
Cricket Media's Open Court portal
Open Court Publishing Company Records, 1886-1953 at Southern Illinois University Carbondale, Special Collections Research Center

Academic publishing companies
Book publishing companies based in Illinois
Companies based in Chicago
Publishing companies established in 1887
Publishing companies of the United States